Alabama National Cemetery is a United States National Cemetery located in Montevallo, Alabama, about 35 miles south of Birmingham, Alabama. It encompasses , will serve veterans' needs for at least the next 50 years, and interments began on June 25, 2009.

History 
The Mobile National Cemetery was closed to interments in the 1990s. The other Alabama site is Fort Mitchell National Cemetery near Phenix City, 150 miles southeast. The Veterans Administration was authorized to establish six new burial sites by the National Cemetery Act of 2003. Areas not served by an existing National Cemetery and containing at least 170,000 veteran residents included Bakersfield, California; Birmingham, Alabama; Jacksonville, Florida; Sarasota County, Florida; southeastern Pennsylvania and Columbia- Greenville, South Carolina.

In July 2007, the Department of Veterans Affairs purchased the Alabama National Cemetery site for approximately $8 million and awarded a contract in September 2007 to Civil Consultants, Inc. to design the new cemetery.

Site status 
Initial construction began in November 2008 and created space for 1,000 casket burials and 1,000 in-ground cremations. Except for minor irrigation work, construction was completed in early June 2009. The grounds were consecrated June 18, 2009, one week before burials were scheduled to commence. A second construction stage was scheduled to start in late 2009 and include an additional 8,100 casket sites, 2,100 in-ground/above-ground cremation sites and 2,700 columbarium niches. 

The first phase of the cemetery includes an entrance, roadways within the section, permanent buildings for administration and maintenance, a public information center and two shelters for services during inclement weather. Infrastructure consisting of drainage, fencing, landscaping, irrigation and utilities is also being built.

Notable interments 
 Virgil Trucks (1917–2013), Major League Baseball pitcher

See also 
 List of cemeteries in Alabama

References

External links 
 National Cemetery Administration
 Alabama National Cemetery
 
 

2009 establishments in Alabama
Cemeteries in Alabama
United States national cemeteries
Protected areas of Shelby County, Alabama